The House of Tan Yeok Nee (Chinese: 陈旭年宅第 or 陈旭年大厦) is a mansion building located at the junction of Penang Road and Clemenceau Avenue in the Museum Planning Area in Singapore. After an extensive restoration completed in 2000, it was held by the University of Chicago Booth School of Business. As of 2019, the building serves as the Singapore campus for Amity Global Institute.

History
The mansion belonged to Chaozhou-born businessman Tan Yeok Nee who built it in 1885. It is the only survivor of the Four Mansions (四大厝) built in the late 19th century. Tan was born in 1827. To escape poverty in his village, he came to Nanyang where he traded textiles. Later, he planted pepper and spices in Johor and became a port owner. In addition, Tan established a joint venture with another Teochew tycoon, Tan Seng Bo, and Chang, a Hoklo (Hokkien) leader, in the then legal opium and liquor trades. Three years later, Tan Yeok Nee immigrated to Singapore, where he built this "House of Administration". He soon amassed a great fortune through his involvement with his trades and the ownership of lucrative property.

Tan's house is one of two surviving examples of traditional Chinese mansions in Singapore; the other is the River House in Clarke Quay. Tan lived in this mansion for most of his life; he died in China at age 75. He outlived his sons and the house was left to his eight grandsons.

At the turn of the 20th century, when the Singapore-Johor Railway was being built, the house was acquired for use by the Tank Road Station master. In 1907, the government transferred Tan's house to the Anglican Church, which established St Mary's Home and School for Eurasian Girls for 20,000 Straits dollars. After the Home was closed in 1932, it was renamed as the Temple House and was used as a boarding house.

On 28 May 1938, the Salvation Army moved its Singapore headquarters to the House. The house remained the Salvation Army's centre of operations for over 50 years, except during the Japanese occupation of Singapore.

Between 1942 and 1945, the occupying Japanese forces used the House as part of its army's headquarters.

After the war, it was found shattered and torn to pieces by repeated bombing and looting. The Salvation Army spent a considerable amount on repairs and rebuilding over the next few years. In July 1951, it was officially reopened by Governor Sir Franklin Gimson.

The House of Tan Yeok Nee and Tan Si Chong Su Temple, along with three other historical sites, were gazetted as national monument on 29 November 1974 because their typically Chinese architecture is a fast vanishing sight in Singapore.

Wing Tai which invested  for its restoration.

Restoration works
University of Chicago Booth School of Business in 2000 for its Asian campus, before moving to Hong Kong in 2013, with the last Singapore cohort graduated in 2015.

The ownership of the House was changed several times since. Perennial, together with Beijing Hospital of Traditional Chinese Medicine set up Ming Yi Guan in the House from 2017 to 2018.

In 2019, Amity Global Institute moved its school to the House. In 2022, the house was sold to the family of the Indonesian tycoon Bachtiar Karim, with the school remaining on the premises.

Architecture
The House of Tan Yeok Nee occupies up to 2,000 square metres of elevated land along Clemenceau Avenue. The mansion has been carefully restored with great sensitivity to ensure that the original architecture and character of the house is kept intact. The walls, tiles, roof, pillars, carvings and pottery were restored to their original state of a century ago through painstaking research.

However, contemporary facilities and equipment have also been incorporated to adapt the building for modern-day usage. With the wide array of beautifully restored traditional Chinese decorative elements and the convenience of present-day state-of-the-art technology around the house, this combination of 'old' and 'new' provides a unique environment rich in history and culture.

The front and back portions of the house face east and west. Pillars on the front door are made of marble with colourful carvings of stories reflecting the lives of Tan Yeok Nee's ancestors in Chaozhou. The back of the house has a distinctive style exhibited by beams with special Teochew tiles, a main pillar decorated with gold-plated carvings, and a marble floor. Exquisite, colourful tiles reflect Chinese people characters and animals.

The House of Tan Yeok Nee is typical of Teochew-style residential buildings. The structure exhibits the harmony of Yin and Yang, shown at the top of the ceiling in gold, wood, water, fire, and earth – the five elements. Armed with traditional philosophical ideas, the designer coordinated the entire building's design to reflect the balance and harmony represented by the five elements. This unique design not only enriches the artistic value of the walls, but also represents the unity of prosperity, intelligence, longevity, health and happiness.

Awards
 2010 FIABCI Prix d'Excellence Award
 2011 URA Archicture Heritage Award

References

National Heritage Board (2002), Singapore's 100 Historic Places, Archipelago Press,

External links
Amity Global Institute – Official Site
National Heritage Board, Singapore – House of Tan Yeok Nee
 Biography of Tan Yeok Nee

Tourist attractions in Singapore
National monuments of Singapore
Houses completed in 1885
Museum Planning Area
University of Chicago
Teochew culture in Singapore
19th-century architecture in Singapore